Dolní Bojanovice is a municipality and village in Hodonín District in the South Moravian Region of the Czech Republic. It has about 3,000 inhabitants.

History
The first written mention of Dolní Bojanovice is from 1196.

Notable people
Petr Esterka (1935–2021), Czech-American bishop

References

Villages in Hodonín District
Moravian Slovakia